"The Woman in Me" is a song by American singer Donna Summer, released as the third and final single from her eponymous tenth studio album (1982). The song reached number 33 on the Billboard Hot 100, number 30 on the Black Singles chart, and number 17 on the Adult Contemporary chart in early 1983. It was written by John Bettis of Carpenters fame.

In North America, the single was also released on a 12-inch blue vinyl picture disc featuring the album cover artwork on an enlarged paper label. Side two featured the song "Livin' in America" from the same album and "The Wanderer", title track to the 1980 album.

Music video
The music video features Summer in a blue dress singing and standing at a room with a unidentified man standing by the door followed by changing colors. The video shows Summer from the chest up as she was pregnant with Amanda Grace at the time.

Charts

Heart version

In 1993, American rock band Heart covered "The Woman in Me" for their eleventh studio album, Desire Walks On. It was released as a single in 1994, but it failed to chart on the Billboard Hot 100, instead peaking at number five on the Bubbling Under Hot 100 Singles chart.

Track listings
US 7-inch jukebox single
A. "The Woman in Me" – 3:58
B. "Risin' Suspicion" – 3:04

US cassette single
A1. "The Woman in Me" (remix) – 4:00
A2. "Risin' Suspicion" – 3:04
B1. "The Woman in Me" (remix) – 4:00
B2. "Risin' Suspicion" – 3:04

US promotional CD single
"The Woman in Me" (remix) – 3:47

Charts

References

1982 songs
1983 singles
1994 singles
Capitol Records singles
Donna Summer songs
Geffen Records singles
Heart (band) songs
Pop ballads
Song recordings produced by Quincy Jones
Songs with lyrics by John Bettis